Cheng'an is a town under the administration of Xinle City in western Hebei province, China, located  northeast of downtown Xinle and served by China National Highway 107. , it has 29 villages under its administration.

See also
List of township-level divisions of Hebei

References

Township-level divisions of Hebei